Dendrophidion dendrophis, also known by its common name olive forest racer, is a species of snake from the genus Dendrophidion.

References

Colubrids
Reptiles described in 1837